Events in the year 1687 in Norway.

Incumbents
Monarch: Christian V

Events

15 April – Cristian V's Norwegian Code was introduced.

Arts and literature

Births

Deaths
6 May – Daniel Danielsen Knoff, civil servant and politician (born 1614).

See also

References